Kristín Ólafsdóttir (1889–1971), was an Icelandic physician. 

She became the third Icelandic woman with a studentexamen in 1911. 

She became the first woman physician in Iceland in 1917.

References

1889 births
1971 deaths
20th-century Icelandic women